(fdp) is a Brazilian comedy-drama television series created by José Roberto Torero and Marcus Aurelius Pimenta and produced by HBO Latin America in partnership with Prodigo Films.

The series premiered on HBO Brasil and HBO Latin America on 26 August 2012 and follows the story of Juarez Gomes da Silva,  a Brazilian soccer referee in the pursuit of his biggest dream to whistle a game of the World Cup. Seeking to accomplish his goals, he ended up chosen to act in one of the Copa Libertadores games. But while his career grows, his personal life begins to go through problems, which can compromise his future.

Cast and characters 

 Eucir de Souza as Juarez Gomes da Silva
 Paulo Tiefenthaler as Carvalhosa
 Vitor Moretti as Vinny
 Maria Cecília Audi as Rosali
 Cynthia Falabella as Manuela
 Fernanda Franceschetto as Vitória da Matta
 Adrian Verdaguer as Guzman
 Walter Breda
 Flavio Tolezani
 Domingas Person
 Chris Couto as Gilda Marques
 Ângelo Vizarro Jr. as Paiva Jr.
 Carlos Meceni as Ladislau Caponero
 Gustavo Machado as Rui Zwiebel
 Saulo Vasconcelos as Sérgio Balado

References

External links

2012 Brazilian television series debuts
2012 Brazilian television series endings
2010s Brazilian television series
Brazilian comedy television series
Brazilian drama television series
Portuguese-language television shows
HBO Latin America original programming
Portuguese-language HBO original programming
Fictional association football television series